Ambato is a rural commune in Analamanga Region, in the  Central Highlands of Madagascar.

It is bordered in the north by the communes of Androvakely, in its east by Sadabe, in the west by Anjanadoria, in the south by Manjakavaradrano and in its south-east by Avaratsena.

References

External links

Populated places in Analamanga